The men's heavyweight (91 kg/200.2 lbs) K-1 category at the W.A.K.O. World Championships 2007 in Belgrade was the second heaviest of the K-1 tournaments, involving twelve fighters from two continents (Europe and Africa).  Each of the matches was three rounds of two minutes each and were fought under K-1 rules.

As there were not enough fighters for a sixteen-man tournament, four of the contestants had a bye through to the quarter finals.  Belarusian Andrei Malchanau ensured that his country kept up their excellent showing in the K-1 category by defeating Macedonia's Atanas Stojkovski to claim the gold.  Serb Nenad Miletic and Croat Zoran Majkic won bronze medals for reaching the semi finals.

Results

See also
List of WAKO Amateur World Championships
List of WAKO Amateur European Championships
List of male kickboxers

References

External links
 WAKO World Association of Kickboxing Organizations Official Site

Kickboxing events at the WAKO World Championships 2007 Belgrade
2007 in kickboxing
Kickboxing in Serbia